Stenotrema hubrichti is a species of air-breathing land snail, a terrestrial pulmonate gastropod mollusk in the family Polygyridae. This species is endemic to the United States.

References

Polygyridae
Endemic fauna of the United States
Gastropods described in 1940
Taxa named by Henry Augustus Pilsbry
Taxonomy articles created by Polbot